John Forrest Dillon (December 25, 1831 – May 6, 1914) was an attorney in Iowa and New York, a justice of the Iowa Supreme Court and a United States circuit judge of the United States Circuit Court for the Eighth Circuit. He authored a highly influential treatise on the power of states over municipal governments.

Education and career

Born on December 25, 1831, in Northampton, (then part of Montgomery County, now part of Fulton County), New York, Dillon received a Doctor of Medicine in 1850 from the University of Iowa. He read law in 1852. He entered private practice in Davenport, Iowa from 1852 to 1853. He was county attorney for Scott County, Iowa from 1853 to 1858. He was a Judge of the Iowa District Court for the Seventh Judicial District from 1858 to 1862. He was a justice of the Iowa Supreme Court from 1862 to 1868.

Federal judicial service

Dillon was nominated by President Ulysses S. Grant on December 9, 1869, to the United States Circuit Court for the Eighth Circuit, to a new seat authorized by 16 Stat. 44. He was confirmed by the United States Senate on December 22, 1869, and received his commission the same day. His service terminated on September 1, 1879, due to his resignation.

Scholarship and notable ruling

While on the federal bench, Dillon wrote Municipal Corporations (1872), one of the earliest systematic studies of the subject. He also authored Removal of Cases from State Courts to Federal Courts and Municipal Bonds, both in 1876. On February 17, 1876, during the Whiskey Ring graft prosecutions, Justice Dillon ruled Ulysses S. Grant's deposition for Orville E. Babcock was admissible in court.

Later career

Following his resignation from the federal bench, Dillon was a Professor of law for Columbia University from 1879 to 1882. He resumed private practice in New York City, New York from 1882 to 1914. He was the Storrs Professor of law at Yale University from 1891 to 1892, during which time he wrote The Laws and Jurisprudence of England and America: Being a Series of Lectures Delivered Before Yale University. He died on May 6, 1914, in New York City.

Memorial

A memorial fountain to Dillon was erected in downtown Davenport in 1918, carved of Indiana limestone in Romanesque style, by sculptor Harry Liva.

Family

In 1853, Dillon married Anna Margery Price (born 19 June 1835). They had two sons and a daughter. Anna and their daughter, Mrs. Annie Dillon Oliver, died in the sinking of the French ocean liner SS La Bourgogne in July, 1898.  Dillon's oldest son, Hiram Price Dillon (1855–1918), became a lawyer in Iowa and a Master of Chancery in federal court. John F. Dillon's sister married John B. Jordan, a Davenport merchant. That marriage produced a daughter Jennie, who married Louis Stengel. Louis and Jennie Stengel had a son, Charles Dillon (Casey) Stengel, named after the Judge, who had a long career as a baseball player and manager.

Dillon's Rule

The theory of state preeminence over local governments was expressed as Dillon's Rule in an 1868 case: "Municipal corporations owe their origin to, and derive their powers and rights wholly from, the legislature. It breathes into them the breath of life, without which they cannot exist. As it creates, so may it destroy. If it may destroy, it may abridge and control". By contrast, the Cooley Doctrine, or the doctrine of home rule, expressed the theory of an inherent right to local self-determination. In a concurring opinion, Michigan Supreme Court Judge Thomas M. Cooley in 1871 stated, "local government is a matter of absolute right; and the state cannot take it away".

In Municipal Corporations (1872), Dillon explained that in contrast to the powers of states, which are unlimited but for express restrictions under the state or federal constitution, municipalities only have the powers that are expressly granted to them. This formulation of the scope of municipal power came to be known as "Dillon's Rule." It holds that municipal governments have only the powers expressly granted to them by the state legislature, those powers necessarily implied by the express powers, and those that are essential and indispensable to the municipality's existence and functioning. Further, the powers expressly granted to the municipality should be narrowly construed, and any ambiguities in the legislative grant of power should be resolved against the municipality. However, when the state has not specifically directed the method by which the municipality may implement its granted power, the municipality has the discretion to choose the method so long as its choice is reasonable.

The Supreme Court of the United States cited Municipal Corporations and fully adopted Dillon's emphasis on state power over municipalities in Hunter v. Pittsburgh, which upheld the power of Pennsylvania to consolidate the city of Allegheny into the city of Pittsburgh, despite the objections of a majority of Allegheny's residents. The Court's ruling that states could alter or abolish at will the charters of municipal corporations without infringing upon contract rights relied upon Dillon's distinction between public, municipal corporations and private ones. However, the Court did not prevent states from passing legislation or amending their constitutions to explicitly allow home rule. This constitutional allowance was reiterated in Trenton v. New Jersey, where the Supreme Court held that "In the absence of state constitutional provisions safeguarding it to them, municipalities have no inherent right of self-government which is beyond the legislative control of the state, but are merely departments of the state, with powers and privileges such as the state has seen fit to grant, held and exercised subject to its sovereign will”.

Hundreds of United States court decisions have employed the Dillon Rule to determine the scope of municipal powers and rights. Critics of the rule have argued that it imposes unreasonable constraints on the ability of communities to govern themselves and undermines democracy or that local self-government is a matter of natural right that does not need to be conferred by higher political structures. Some have suggested that Dillon's approach derived from the contemporary view that cities were inherently corrupt political organs. States which do not follow Dillon's Rule—home rule states, including Dillon's own Iowa—remain in the minority, despite the significant decrease in the public perception of municipal corruption.

David Y. Miller argues that Dillon hit upon a central paradox defining American cities: having great political authority while having little legal legitimacy. He quotes Dillon as calling municipalities "mere tenants at will of their respective state legislatures" which could be "eliminated by the legislature with a stroke of the pen". Dillon also said that eliminating local government would be "so great a folly, and so great a wrong".

References

Sources
 Gerald E. Frug et al., Local Government Law, 3rd ed. pp. 139–158. West Publishing, 2001.
 See Arlington County v. White, 528 S.E.2d 706 (Va. 2000), for a modern use of the Dillon Rule to invalidate municipal action. See State v. Hutchison, 624 P.2d 1116 (Utah 1980) for an example of the minority, critical view.
 David Y. Miller, The Regional Governing of Metropolitan America, pp. 1–2. Westview Press, 2002.
 Robert W. Creamer, "Stengel: His Life and Times," pp. 21–23.

External links
 

1831 births
1914 deaths
19th-century American judges
American legal writers
Columbia Law School faculty
Iowa lawyers
Iowa state court judges
Justices of the Iowa Supreme Court
Judges of the United States circuit courts
Judges of the United States Court of Appeals for the Eighth Circuit
People from Northampton, Fulton County, New York
United States federal judges appointed by Ulysses S. Grant
Writers from Davenport, Iowa
Writers from New York (state)
Yale Law School faculty
United States federal judges admitted to the practice of law by reading law
Presidents of the American Bar Association